The 2011 Louisiana Tech Bulldogs football team represented Louisiana Tech University as a member of the Western Athletic Conference (WAC) during the 2011 NCAA Division I FBS football season. Led by second-year head coach Sonny Dykes, the Bulldogs played their home games at Joe Aillet Stadium in Ruston, Louisiana. Louisiana Tech finished the regular season with an 8–4 overall record and a 6–1 mark in conference play to win the WAC title. The Bulldogs lost the Poinsettia Bowl in San Diego against the TCU Horned Frogs, the champions of the Mountain West Conference.

Before the season

Recruiting

After the Spring Game at Joe Aillet Stadium, it was announced that Hunter Lee, Blake Martin, and Vincent Moore would walk on at Louisiana Tech. After playing as a wide receiver and a safety at River Oaks High School in Monroe, Louisiana, Vincent Moore plans to play safety at Louisiana Tech. Hunter Lee will likely tryout for a position at running back after earning District 8-5A MVP honors at Flower Mound High School in 2010.

T-Day Spring Game

On May 24, Sonny Dykes dismissed wide receivers Ahmed Paige and Tim Molton from the team due to a violation of team rules.

Awards and award watch lists
Ryan Allen

2011 Walter Camp Football Foundation All-American (Second Team)
Winner of the 2011 Ray Guy Award
First-Team All-WAC (punter)
WAC Special Teams Player of the Week (Week 6)
WAC Special Teams Player of the Week (Week 8)

Chad Boyd
Second-Team All-WAC (defensive back)

Matt Broha
2011 Preseason First-Team All-WAC
2011 First-Team All-WAC (defensive line)

Colby Cameron
WAC Offensive Player of the Week (Week 10)

Terry Carter
First-Team All-WAC (defensive back)

Kris Cavitt
First-Team All-WAC (offensive lineman)

Adrien Cole
2011 WAC Defensive Player of the Year
First-Team All-WAC (linebacker)
WAC Defensive Player of the Week (Week 8)
WAC Defensive Player of the Week (Week 12)

Lennon Creer
2011 Preseason First Team All-WAC
Doak Walker Award watch list

Jay Dudley
Second-Team All-WAC (linebacker)

Justin Ellis
Second-Team All-WAC (defensive lineman)

IK Enemkpali
WAC Defensive Player of the Week (Week 11)

Craig Johnson
WAC Special Teams Player of the Week (Week 13)

Hunter Lee
WAC Offensive Player of the Week (Week 13)

Matt Nelson
Second-Team All-WAC (placekicker)

Quinton Patton

First-Team All-WAC (wide receiver)
Fred Biletnikoff Award watch list

Tommy Spangler
Broyles Award nominee

Stephen Warner

First-Team All-WAC (offensive lineman)

Schedule

Roster

Game summaries

Southern Miss

Sources:

The Bulldogs opened the 2011 football season on the road against the Southern Mississippi Golden Eagles of Conference USA. The game was the second in a scheduled 4-game football series between the two universities from 2010 to 2014. Southern Miss defeated Louisiana Tech 19–17 in a game that was played during periods of heavy rain and high winds due to Tropical Storm Lee.

Southern Miss scored the game's first touchdown at 11:38 in the first quarter to take a 7–0 lead. After neither team scored the rest of the first half, both teams hit field goals to make the score Southern Miss 10, Louisiana Tech 3 with 14 seconds left in the third quarter. Louisiana Tech tied the game at 10–10 when Lyle Fitte ran back a kickoff return 86 yards for a touchdown as the third quarter ended. After USM scored a field goal with 11:42 left in the contest to take a 13–10 lead, Louisiana Tech recovered a fumbled punt by Southern Miss at the USM 3-yard line. Lennon Creer scored Tech's sole offensive touchdown of the night on a 1-yard carry to give Tech a 17–13 lead with 9:43 left in the game. Southern Miss took a 19–17 lead after hitting field goals of 42 yards and 49 yards. Southern Miss went on to win the game after time expired with Louisiana Tech's offense in Southern Miss territory.

Louisiana Tech's offense had 244 total yards in the game with Lennon Creer running 17 times for 53 yards and 1 touchdown. True freshman Nick Isham went completed 20 passes on 36 attempts for 176 yards and kicked two punts for 77 yards in his first collegiate football start. Tech's defense held Southern Miss to 379 total yards and allowed one touchdown and four field goals in the contest. Tech's special teams personnel blocked a field goal in the first quarter, scored a kickoff return TD in the third quarter, and recovered a fumbled punt by USM in the fourth quarter.

Central Arkansas

Sources:

Louisiana Tech opened their home schedule at Joe Aillet Stadium by hosting the University of Central Arkansas Bears for the third meeting between the two schools and the first since 2007. The Louisiana Tech Bulldogs defeated the UCA Bears 48–42 in overtime. Louisiana Tech took an early 7–0 lead after a 42-yard touchdown pass from Nick Isham to Quinton Patton. After UCA kicked a 39-yard field goal to cut the lead to 7–3, Isham completed a 72-yard touchdown pass to Patton to extend the Louisiana Tech to 14–3 over Central Arkansas. Near the end of the first quarter, UCA quarterback Nathan Dick completed a 17-yard touchdown pass to Jessie Grandy to cut the Tech lead to 14–10. In the second quarter, Tech running back Lennon Creer ran for a 5-yard touchdown and UCA's Dominiqu Croom caught a 3-yard touchdown from Nathan Dick to make the halftime score Louisiana Tech 21, Central Arkansas 17.

The third quarter started with a 35-yard field goal by UCA to cut the lead to 21–20 Louisiana Tech. Tech answered with a 4-yard touchdown run by Ray Holley and a 12-yard touchdown run by Lennon Creer to extend Tech's lead to 35–20 with 4:55 left in the third quarter. Nathan Dick threw two touchdown passes of 43 and 56 yards respectively and connected on a two-point conversion attempt to tie the ball game at 35–35 with 14:10 left in the fourth quarter. With 2:08 left in the game, Jerrel McKnight recovered a fumble by Lennon Creer and ran 73 yards for a touchdown to give Central Arkansas its first lead of the night, 42–35. Ray Holley scored his second rushing touchdown in the game on a seven-yard carry to cap a seven-play, 72-yard drive in 1 minute, 10 seconds to tie the contest at 42–42.

The game went into overtime after the fourth quarter ended with the game tied at 42–42. UCA received the ball first in the overtime period and had a 39-yard field goal blocked by Adrian Cole. Louisiana Tech went on to score on a 1-yard touchdown run by Lennon Creer to give Louisiana Tech a 48–42 victory over Central Arkansas in the first overtime game for Louisiana Tech since their September 8, 2007 home game against the Hawaii Warriors.

Nick Isham completed 22 of 37 passes for 318 yards, 2 touchdowns, and 1 interception. Lennon Creer had 32 carries for 183 yards and 3 touchdowns while Ray Holley ran the ball 9 times for 49 yards and 2 touchdowns. Wide receiver Quinton Patton caught 8 passes for 211 yards and two touchdowns. Patton's 211 yard performance is tied for 10th place for the most receiving yards in a single game by a Louisiana Tech player.

Houston

Sources:

Louisiana Tech hosted the Houston Cougars in their second home game of the 2011 football season. The matchup between Louisiana Tech and the University of Houston is the first game in a scheduled four-game football series that will run from 2011 to 2014. The Houston Cougars defeated the Louisiana Tech Bulldogs 35–34 after Houston scored 28 unanswered points to complete the biggest comeback in their program's history.

Louisiana Tech took a 7–0 lead after Lennon Creer scored a 1-yard rushing touchdown with 11:12 left in the first quarter. Tech extended their lead over Houston to 10–0 after Matt Nelson kicked a 30-yard field goal with 10:10 left in the second quarter. Houston scored its first points of the night with 7:21 left in the second quarter when Case Keenum connected with Michael Hayes for a 54-yard touchdown to cut Louisiana Tech's lead to 10–7. Louisiana Tech answered with a 2-yard touchdown run by Ray Holley and a 47-yard field goal by Nelson to take the 20–7 lead at halftime.

Both teams traded punts to open the third quarter. With 6:47 left in the third quarter, Louisiana Tech QB Nick Isham completed a 16-yard touchdown pass to Quinton Patton to increase Tech's lead to 27–7. After Quinn Giles intercepted a pass by Case Keenum, Ray Holley scored his second rushing touchdown in the game on a 7-yard TD run to bring the Louisiana Tech lead to 34–7 with 5:11 left in the third quarter. Houston began their comeback when Keenum completed a 50-yard touchdown pass with 4:27 left in the third quarter to make the score Louisiana Tech 34, Houston 14. Bryce Beall ran for a 2-yard touchdown to cut the Tech lead to 34–21 with 12:53 left in the fourth quarter. After Houston recovered a fumble by Tech's Ray Holley, Houston completed an 80-yard drive down the field with a 4-yard touchdown run by Beall to make the score 34–28 Louisiana Tech with 7:25 remaining in the game. Houston took its first lead of the night after Keenum threw a 32-yard touchdown pass to make the score Houston 35–34 with 1:36 remaining in the game. Houston went on to win the game after Tech turned the ball over on downs in the last minute of the game.

Louisiana Tech generated 444 yards on offense on 98 plays. Lennon Creer and Ray Holley combined for 47 carries, 161 yards, and three touchdowns on the ground, as Louisiana Tech ran 66 rushing plays in the game which is tied for the 2nd-most carries by a Bulldog team in the history of the program. Quinton Patton caught five passes for 82 yards and one touchdown for the evening and was later named to the Fred Biletnikoff Award Watch List after the game as a result of his play through the first three games of the 2011 college football season. The crowd of 24,628 at Joe Aillet Stadium for the Louisiana Tech vs. Houston marked the sixth-largest crowd for a Louisiana Tech football game at Joe Aillet Stadium.

Mississippi State

Sources:

Louisiana Tech traveled to Starkville, Mississippi to play the Mississippi State Bulldogs in their second road game of the 2011 football season. This meeting marked the first meeting between the two schools since the 2008 season opener at Ruston and only the second meeting since 1996. The Mississippi State Bulldogs defeated Louisiana Tech 26–20 in overtime.

Mississippi State took a 7–0 lead after Chad Bumphis returned a punt 82 yards for a touchdown with 9:20 left in the first quarter. Louisiana Tech cut the lead to 7–3 after Matt Nelson made a 43-yard field goal with 5:49 left in the first quarter. At the 14:17 mark in the second quarter, Louisiana Tech took a 10–7 lead when Lennon Creer scored a 4-yard rushing touchdown to cap off an 11-play, 80-yard drive. Mississippi State retook the lead after Vick Ballard scored an 11-yard rushing touchdown with 8:45 remaining in the second quarter to make the score 14–10 Mississippi State. Mississippi State added a field goal to take a 17–10 lead going into halftime.

After both teams traded punts to open the second half, Louisiana Tech tied the game at 17–17 after QB Nick Isham completed a 14-yard touchdown pass to Quinton Patton with 8:25 left in the third quarter. Mississippi State regained the lead after Depasquale hit a 24-yard field goal to take a 20–17 lead with 5:21 left in the third quarter. With 8:42 left in the game, Louisiana Tech tied the game 20–20 when Matt Nelson hit his second field goal of the game. The score of the game remained tied at 20–20 when the fourth quarter ended. Overtime began with Louisiana Tech on offense. Tech's drive ended with no points scored after Nick Isham threw an interception to Mississippi State's Nickoe Whitley. Mississippi State won the game 26–20 on its offensive possession in overtime after Chris Relf threw a 17-yard touchdown pass.

The Mississippi State game marked the second overtime game for the Louisiana Tech Bulldogs for the 2011 football season. This is also the second time in program history that Louisiana Tech has played two overtime games in one season. The six-point loss to Mississippi State was the third close loss of the year for Louisiana Tech, as their first three losses of the 2011 season were by a combined nine points.

Hawaii

Sources:

Louisiana Tech hosted the Hawaii Warriors in their third home game and the first WAC conference game of the 2011 football season. This meeting marked the final game between the two schools as members of the Western Athletic Conference, since Hawaii will leave the WAC and join the Mountain West Conference after the end of the 2011–2012 season. The Hawaii Warriors defeated Louisiana Tech 44–26 before a crowd of 25,212, the fourth largest crowd in the history of a Tech football game at Joe Aillet Stadium.

Louisiana Tech took a 6–0 lead over Hawaii after Nick Isham completed a two-yard touchdown pass to Quinton Patton with 8:40 left in the first quarter. Hawaii responded with three touchdown passes by Bryant Moniz to Royce Pollard in the remainder of the first half to take a 21–6 lead over Louisiana Tech at halftime.

Louisiana Tech cut Hawaii's lead to 20–13 when Nick Isham connected with Taulib Ikharo on a 7-yard touchdown pass with 13:37 left in the third quarter. With 9:29 left in the third quarter, Bryant Moniz threw a 6-yard touchdown pass to Craig Stutzmann to extend Hawaii's lead to 27–13. Hawaii's defense scored 14 points off a 49-yard interception return and a 16-yard fumble recovery to increase Hawaii's lead to 41–13 with 7:46 left in the third quarter. Lennon Creer ran for a 10-yard touchdown to cut the Hawaii lead to 41–20 with 6:40 left in the third quarter. Hawaii added a field goal at the 3:01 mark in the third quarter in take a 44–20 lead. Nick Isham ran for a 4-yard touchdown to make the game score Hawaii 44–26 at the 7:55 mark in the fourth quarter. Louisiana Tech went on to lose the game to Hawaii by a score of 44–26.

Louisiana Tech's 2011 record fell to 1–4 overall and 0–1 in the WAC while Hawaii improved its record to 3–2 overall and 1–0 in the WAC.

Idaho

Sources:

Louisiana Tech traveled to Moscow, Idaho to face the Idaho Vandals in their second conference game of the year. The Bulldogs defeated the Idaho Vandals 24–11 to end their three-game losing streak.

After a scoreless first quarter, Louisiana Tech took a 3–0 lead in the game after Matt Nelson kicked a 23-yard field goal with 14:56 left in the second quarter. Tech's lead was cut to 3–2 after Idaho scored a safety when Andre Ferguson tackled Louisiana Tech's Lennon Creer in Tech's endzone at the 12:27 mark in the second quarter. Louisiana Tech increased the lead to 10–2 after Jay Dudley intercepted a pass by Idaho's Brain Reader and completed a 53-yard return for a touchdown with 4:47 left in the second quarter. Idaho scored on a 43-yard field goal with 2:57 left in the second quarter to make the score Louisiana Tech 10–5. Louisiana Tech scored fourteen points in the third quarter as a result of a 6-yard touchdown pass to David Gru and a 1-yard touchdown run by Nick Isham to increase their lead to 24–5. Idaho's Justin Veltung returned a punt by Tech's Ryan Allen for an 81-yard touchdown with 3:35 left in the fourth quarter to make the final score 24–11 Louisiana Tech.

Hunter Lee received a majority of the carries for Louisiana Tech in place of Lennon Creer and rushed 28 times for 134 yards. Nick Isham was 25/39 for 163 yards and 2 touchdowns (1 rushing, 1 passing). Ryan Allen was named the WAC Special Teams Player of the Week for his punting performance against Idaho. He punted the ball ten times for an average for 48 yards, including 6 downed balls inside the opponent's 20-yard line.

Utah State

Sources:

After a bye week after the Idaho game, Louisiana Tech played Utah State at Logan, Utah. Louisiana Tech's 24–17 victory over Utah State marked their second straight victory this season and the first time that Louisiana Tech has won four consecutive WAC road games since joining the conference in 2001. The game also featured a quarterback change for Louisiana Tech when Colby Cameron substituted for Nick Isham late in the third quarter.

Louisiana Tech took the first lead of the game after Lennon Creer ran for a 3-yard touchdown to make the score Louisiana Tech 7–0 at the 8:22 mark in the first quarter. Utah State responded with a 1-yard touchdown run by Robert Turpin to tie the game at 7–7 with 3:20 left in the first quarter. Utah State took a 10–7 lead after Josh Thompson hit a 43-yard field goal with 7:57 left in the second quarter. Louisiana Tech retook the lead from Utah State with 11:36 left in the third quarter after Terry Carter intercepted a pass by Chuckie Keeton and returned it 22 yards for a touchdown to make the score 14–10 for Louisiana Tech. Utah State captured the lead again after Chuckie Keeton scored on a 29-yard touchdown run with 7:41 left in the third quarter to make the score 17–14 Utah State. The Bulldogs took a 21–17 lead after Hunter Lee scored an 8-yard touchdown run with 10:14 left in the fourth quarter. Matt Nelson connected on a 24-yard field goal with 2:46 left in the game to make the final score 24–17 Louisiana Tech.

Colby Cameron came into the game for Louisiana Tech late in the third quarter after Nick Isham struggled for most of the game at quarterback. This was the first game in which Cameron completed a pass since September 18, 2010 against Navy. Adrian Cole was named the WAC Defensive Player of the Week, and Ryan Allen was named the WAC Special Teams Player of the Week for their performances against Utah State.

San Jose State

Sources:

Louisiana Tech hosted the San Jose State Spartans at Joe Aillet Stadium in Ruston, Louisiana for their annual Homecoming game. Louisiana Tech defeated the Spartans 38–38 to win their third consecutive game this season and improved their record to 4–4 (3–1 in conference play) for the 2011 season. Colby Cameron started at quarterback for Louisiana Tech in place of the injured Nick Isham.

Louisiana Tech took the first lead with 8:59 left in the third quarter when Matt Nelson hit a 25-yard field goal to make the score 3–0. San Jose State took a 7–3 lead at the 6:50 mark in the first quarter when Brandon Rutley ran for a 1-yard touchdown. Louisiana Tech retook the lead at the 10:31 mark in the second quarter when Richie Casey ran for a 21-yard touchdown to make the score 10–7 in favor of the Bulldogs. With 8:29 remaining in the second quarter, San Jose State took a 14–10 lead after Matt Faulkner threw a 60-yard touchdown to Noel Grigsby. Louisiana Tech took a 17–14 lead at the 7:20 mark in the second quarter after Colby Cameron threw a 90-yard touchdown pass to Quinton Patton. Tech scored another touchdown on a 2-yard pass from Cameron to Quinton Patton to extend the lead to 24–14 going into the half.

The Bulldogs started the second half with a 1-yard touchdown run by Lennon Creer to take a 31–14 lead with 11:15 left in the third quarter. Jay Dudley intercepted a pass by Matt Faulkner and returned it for a 36-yard touchdown to make the score 38–14 for Louisiana Tech. Dudley's interception return for a touchdown marked the second INT return for a touchdown in the last three games. San Jose State scored a touchdown and a two-point conversion with 43 seconds left in the third quarter to trim Louisiana Tech's lead to 38–22. San Jose State would score another touchdown with a 20-yard touchdown reception to Ryan Otten to make the final score Louisiana Tech 38–28.

In his first start in 2011, Colby Cameron was 17/27 for 237 yards, and 2 touchdowns. Lennon Creer ran the ball 31 times for 112 yards, and 1 touchdown. Quinton Patton had 5 receptions for 116 yards and 2 touchdowns. The 90-yard touchdown pass from Cameron to Patton was the fifth-longest reception in Louisiana Tech history and the longest touchdown of the 2011 season for Louisiana Tech. Tech's defense held San Jose State to a season-low 12 yards rushing and forced five turnovers, including four interceptions.

Fresno State

Sources:

Louisiana Tech traveled to Fresno, California to face the Fresno State Bulldogs. With Fresno State moving to the Mountain West Conference after the 2011–12 season, this game was probably the final meeting between the two teams for the foreseeable future. Louisiana Tech defeated Fresno State 41–21 to win their fourth consecutive game and improve the season record to 5–4 (4–1 in WAC play).

Louisiana Tech took a 7–0 lead at the 10:01 mark in the first quarter when Colby Cameron threw a 45-yard touchdown pass to Quinton Patton. Tech extended the lead to 14–0 when Cameron threw a 22-yard touchdown pass to Quinton Patton with 4:40 left in the first quarter. Matt Nelson hit a 26-yard field goal to increase LA Tech's lead to 17–0 with 14:19 remaining in the second quarter. Fresno State scored a touchdown on a 6-yard pass from Derek Carr to Victor Dean to cut Louisiana Tech's lead to 17–7 with 9:40 left in the second quarter. Louisiana Tech responded with a 53-yard rushing touchdown by Lennon Creer and a 75-yard touchdown pass from Colby Cameron to Myles White to make the score Louisiana Tech 31–7 with 5:23 left in the second quarter. Matt Nelson hit a 40-yard field goal at the end of the second quarter to make the score Louisiana Tech 34–7.

Louisiana Tech extended their lead to 41–7 at the 10:26 mark in the third quarter after Colby Cameron threw a 6-yard touchdown pass to Richie Casey. Fresno State cut the lead to 41–14 when Derek Carr threw a 16-yard touchdown pass to Jalen Saunders with 7:03 remaining in the third quarter. Fresno State scored one more touchdown at the 6:14 mark in the fourth quarter when Derek Carr threw a 24-yard pass to Devon White to make the final score of the game Louisiana Tech 41, Fresno State 21.

Colby Cameron was named the WAC Offensive Player of the Week after his performance in the Fresno State game. Cameron was 19/33 for 376 yards, four touchdowns, and no interceptions. Lennon Creer had 17 carries for 116 yards and one touchdown. Quinton Patton had 6 receptions for 97 yards and 2 TDs, and Myles White had 2 catches for 130 yards, and 1 TD.

Ole Miss

Sources:

Nevada

Sources:

New Mexico State

Sources:

TCU

Sources:

The Louisiana Tech Bulldogs accepted an invitation to the 2011 Poinsettia Bowl after defeating New Mexico State and winning the WAC Championship in their regular season finale on November 25.

Statistics

Team

Scores by quarter

Offense

Rushing

Passing

Receiving

Defense

Special teams

References
General

Specific

Louisiana Tech
Louisiana Tech Bulldogs football seasons
Western Athletic Conference football champion seasons
Louisiana Tech Bulldogs football